The New Zealand national cricket team toured England from 8 May to 23 June 2015 for two Test matches, five One Day Internationals (ODIs) and a Twenty20 International (T20I) against the England cricket team. They also played two four-day tour matches and a one-day match against English county sides. England won the first Test at Lord's before New Zealand claimed victory in the second Test at Headingley to level the series. England then took an early lead in the ODI series after hitting more than 400 runs for the first time in their history in the first ODI at Edgbaston, before New Zealand reclaimed the lead with successive wins at The Oval and the Rose Bowl, only for England to mount successful run chases in the last two ODIs at Trent Bridge and the Riverside Ground to claim the series 3–2. England then won the only T20I at Old Trafford by 56 runs.

Squads

± Adam Milne withdrew from the squad due to injury and was replaced by Ben Wheeler.

†Liam Plunkett was called up for the 2nd Test.
 After the second ODI, Chris Jordan and Liam Plunkett withdrew from the ODI series, and were replaced by Craig and Jamie Overton. Trent Boult also withdrew due to injury and was replaced by Andrew Mathieson.
$ Jos Buttler was ruled out of the last ODI, and replaced by Jonny Bairstow.

Tour matches

First-class: Somerset vs New Zealanders

Four-day: Worcestershire vs New Zealanders

List A: Leicestershire Foxes vs New Zealanders

Test series

1st Test

2nd Test

ODI series

1st ODI

2nd ODI

3rd ODI

4th ODI

5th ODI

T20I series

Only T20I

References

External links
 Series home at ESPNcricinfo

2015 in English cricket
2015
International cricket competitions in 2015